Kashigaun is a village development committee in Gorkha District in the Gandaki Zone of northern-central Nepal. At the time of the 1991 Nepal census it had a population of 1,440 and had 305 houses in the village.

References

Populated places in Gorkha District